Geraldine Frances Doogue  (born 29 April 1952) is an Australian journalist and radio and television presenter.

Career 
After graduating from the University of Western Australia with a Bachelor of Arts degree, Doogue intended to train as a schoolteacher, but instead decided to apply for a cadetship at The West Australian newspaper. She later worked for The Australian and spent several years in the United Kingdom as London correspondent for Rupert Murdoch's Australian newspapers.  Australian Broadcasting Corporation executives were so impressed with Doogue's on-air presence during an interview with the Four Corners program, that she was offered a hosting role on Nationwide. In 1985 she and Richard Morecroft co-hosted The National, the ABC's short-lived experiment with a nationwide hour-long nightly news service, combining news and current affairs, with Max Walsh and Richard Carleton as chief reporters.

She worked at TEN-10 Sydney from 1988 to 1989 as co-presenter on Eyewitness News with Steve Liebmann and on commercial radio with 2UE, then returned to the ABC in 1990.

In 1990 Doogue hosted the Ethnic Business Awards, which is a national business award highlighting migrant and Indigenous excellence in business. She went on to host these awards again in 1995, 1999, 2002, and 2004.

Doogue was the host of Radio National's Life Matters program for 11 years from its inception in 1992. She received a United Nations Association of Australia Media Peace Award and two Penguin Awards for her role in ABC TV's coverage of the Gulf War. She was the host of Compass on ABC TV from 1998 to 2017. Since 2005, she has hosted the Extra and Saturday Extra programs on Radio National.

In November 2018, Doogue was inducted into the Australian Media Hall of Fame.

Personal life 
Doogue was first  married to Tim Blue and then to ABC executive Ian Carroll who died from pancreatic cancer on 19 August 2011. With Carroll she had two children and two stepchildren. Her elder daughter with Tim Blue, Eliza Harvey, is also an ABC journalist who is married to Adam Harvey, a son of journalist Peter Harvey.

Works

Honours and awards

 Two Penguin Awards for excellence in broadcasting
 United Nations Media Peace Prize
 Churchill Fellowship for social and cultural reporting
 Doctor of the University, University of Newcastle Australia, 2015.
 Honorary degree, Australian National University, 2019

References

External links
Long Distance Call
Profile at the Australian Women's Register
ABC profile for Saturday Extra

1952 births
Living people
Australian radio journalists
ABC radio (Australia) journalists and presenters
10 News First presenters
Officers of the Order of Australia
Australian women television journalists
Women radio journalists
Australian people of Irish descent